

Oman
 Mombasa – Sa‘id al-Hadermi, Wali of Mombasa (1735–1739)

Portugal
 Angola – 
 Rodrigo César de Meneses, Governor of Angola (1733–1738)
 Joaquim Jacques de Magalhães, Governor of Angola (1738–1748)
 Macau –
 Cosme Damiao Pinto Pereira, Governor of Macau (1735–1738)
 D. Diogo Pereira, Governor of Macau (1738–1743)

Colonial governors
Colonial governors
1738